The Blue Ribbon Awards Special Award is a special prize. It is awarded irregularly by the Association of Tokyo Film Journalists as one of the Blue Ribbon Awards. It was firstly awarded in 1988 at 31st Blue Ribbon Awards.

List of winners

References

External links
Blue Ribbon Awards on IMDb

Awards established in 1988
Recurring events established in 1988
1988 establishments in Japan
Blue Ribbon Awards